USS Rotanin (AK-108) was a  commissioned by the United States Navy for service in World War II. Rotanin, which is a misspelling of the name "Rotanen", was named after the star Beta Delphini, a star located in the constellation Delphinus. She was responsible for delivering troops, goods and equipment to locations in the Asiatic-Pacific Theater.

Construction
Rotanin was laid down 24 July 1943, under United States Maritime Commission (MARCOM) contract, MC hull No. 1872, as the Liberty ship SS William Kelly, by California Shipbuilding Corporation, Terminal Island, Los Angeles, California; launched 18 August 1943; sponsored by Mrs. Andrew R. Bone; and commissioned 23 November 1943.

Service history
Completing shakedown 5 December, Rotanin loaded her first combat cargo and embarked her first military passengers at Port Hueneme, California, and on 12 December, sailed for Nouméa. Arriving 5 January 1944, she carried troops and cargo to Guadalcanal, then, on 27 December, continued on to the Russell Islands. By 2 February, she had discharged all cargo and was underway back to the Guadalcanal-Florida Island area. From then until March, she carried cargo and personnel throughout the Bismarck Archipelago, the Solomons, the Fijis, and the New Hebrides. In April, she completed a run to Auckland, New Zealand, and in May, she moved supplies to Manus. She then resumed runs in the Solomons-New Hebrides-Fiji area.

Supporting the Allied invasion forces 
In August, Rotanin shifted to the Marshalls-Marianas area and at the end of the month she moved further west, to Ulithi. In October, she carried United States Army units to the Palaus, embarked Marines there, and transported them to the Russells. In November, she returned to operations in the Marianas, extended them to the Carolines, and in January 1945, returned to Nouméa. February and March took her back to Micronesia and New Zealand. In April, she was in the Solomons, and, in May, she took on Army supplies and reinforcements for the Okinawa campaign. Arriving off the Hagushi beaches on 21 May, she completed offloading by the end of the month and on 31 May, she steamed east.

End-of-war activity 
During June and July, Rotanin again operated in the Marshalls and Marianas. On 28 July, she headed for Hawaii and the west coast. En route when hostilities ceased, she arrived at San Francisco, California, on 17 August. In October, she joined the ships assigned to transpacific operations to ferry occupation troops to Japan and Korea and to return veterans to the United States.

Post-war inactivation and decommissioning 
On 2 February 1946, Rotanin arrived at San Francisco and reported to the Commander, 12th Naval District for inactivation. She was decommissioned on 5 April 1946, and returned to MARCOM. Her name was stricken from the Navy List on 17 April 1946.

Fate
She was placed in the National Defense Reserve Fleet, Suisun Bay Group, until purchased by Nicolai Joffe Corporation, 29 April 1966, for $50,165. She was removed from the fleet on 5 May 1966, and her scrapping was completed 30 August 1966, at National Steel and Shipbuilding Company (NASSCO).

Awards
Rotanin earned one battle star during World War II. Her crew was eligible for the following medals:
 American Campaign Medal
 Asiatic–Pacific Campaign Medal (1)
 World War II Victory Medal
 Navy Occupation Service Medal (with Asia clasp)

Media

Notes

Bibliography

Online citations

External links
 

Crater-class cargo ships
World War II auxiliary ships of the United States
Ships built in Los Angeles
1943 ships
Suisun Bay Reserve Fleet